Aryan Pandit is an Indian  actor and model. Pandit's acting career began with the TV series Actor, which aired on Colors TV. His first TV serial was na ana is desh lado.

Television

Personal life 
Aryan Pandit was born and brought up in Varanasi. He was the runner up for the Mr Eastern UP pageant.

References

External links 
 

Indian male television actors
Living people
Indian male soap opera actors
Male actors in Hindi cinema
Indian television presenters
Year of birth missing (living people)